Neville Alan Rollason (16 February 1895 – 5 March 1976) was an Australian rules footballer who played with Geelong in the Victorian Football League (VFL).

Notes

References
 
 An Official Group, The Australasian, (Saturday, 7 December 1940), p.30.

External links 

1895 births
1976 deaths
People educated at Melbourne Grammar School
Australian rules footballers from Melbourne
Geelong Football Club players
People from Heidelberg, Victoria